The Chamber of Deputies of La Pampa Province is the unicameral legislative body of La Pampa Province, in Argentina. It convenes in the provincial capital, Santa Rosa.

It comprises 30 legislators, elected in a single multi-member district through proportional representation every four years. Elections employ the D'Hondt system and a 3% electoral threshold.

Its powers and responsibilities are established in the provincial constitution. The legislature is presided by the Vice Governor of La Pampa (presently Mariano Fernández of the Pampean Justicialist Front), who is elected alongside the governor.

History
The Legislature of La Pampa was established after the National Territory of La Pampa became an official province of Argentina, under the name of "Eva Perón Province". The 1951 constituent assembly, which wrote and adopted the first constitution of Eva Perón Province, mandated the election of a provincial Chamber of Representatives, with 21 members elected in single-member constituencies which were designed especially for the legislative body. The chamber convened for the first time on 4 June 1953, in the municipal building of Santa Rosa.

Seat
The Chamber of Deputies convenes in the Centro Cívico complex, in the provincial capital of Santa Rosa. The governor's offices, as well as provincial courts and other government offices all have its headquarters in the Centro Cívico as well. The entire complex was designed by Italian-Argentine architect Clorindo Testa. The Chamber of Deputies building was completed in 1976, during the second stage of construction.

The complex was designed in the brutalist style, with influences from Le Corbusier's 1953 Secretariat Building, in Chandigarh. In 2006, an annex for the Chamber of Deputies Library, also designed by Testa, was completed.

References

External links
 
Constitution of La Pampa Province 

1953 establishments in Argentina
Politics of Argentina
La Pampa Province
La Pampa